Allen Seymour Tedrow (December 14, 1891 – January 23, 1958) was a Major League Baseball pitcher. Although he had an impressive ERA of 1.21 (against a league average of 2.87) in 22 innings, he never pitched in the majors after that.

Sources

Major League Baseball pitchers
Cleveland Naps players
Akron Champs players
Ironton Nailers players
Lexington Colts players
Portsmouth Cobblers players
Baseball players from Ohio
People from Westerville, Ohio
1891 births
1958 deaths